"Hideaway" is a song by Dave Dee, Dozy, Beaky, Mick & Tich, released as a single in June 1966. It peaked at number 10 on the UK Singles Chart.

Track listing 
7": Fontana / TF 711

 "Hideaway" – 2:21
 "Here's a Heart" – 3:13

Reception 
Reviewed in Record Mirror: "The boys invariably get something dead catchy going – here it's an opening instrumentally, with a repetitive beat. Another good vocal arrangement and the song stands up in any company".

Charts

References 

1966 singles
1966 songs
Fontana Records singles
Songs written by Alan Blaikley
Songs written by Ken Howard (composer)
Song recordings produced by Steve Rowland